The California Western Railroad , AKA Mendocino Railway popularly called the Skunk Train, is a rail freight and heritage railroad transport railway in Mendocino County, California, United States, running from the railroad's headquarters in the coastal town of Fort Bragg to the interchange with the Northwestern Pacific Railroad at Willits.

The CWR runs steam  and diesel-powered trains and rail motor cars through Redwood forests along Pudding Creek and the Noyo River. Along the way, the tracks cross some 30 single bridges and trestles and pass through two deep mountain tunnels. The halfway point, short of Northspur, is a popular meal and beverage spot for the railroad's passengers.

History
Fort Bragg Redwood Company was incorporated into the new Union Lumber Company in 1891; railroad ownership remained with the parent lumber company until 1969. Chinese tunnel builders completed  Tunnel No. 1 from Pudding Creek to the Noyo River in 1893. Rails had been extended up the Noyo River to Alpine by 1904 when passenger service began with a stagecoach connection to the inland town of Willits. On July 1, 1905, the railroad was renamed the California Western Railroad & Navigation Company and shipped lumber on a fleet of steam schooners, first with wooden hulls and later with steel, until shipboard transportation of lumber ended in 1940.

Completion of  tunnel #2 on December 11, 1911 allowed interchange connection with the Northwestern Pacific Railroad at Willits, 40 rail miles (64 km) from Fort Bragg.

The rail connection to Fort Bragg was very popular for passengers traveling to and from San Francisco. Union Lumber Company selected premium grade clear redwood lumber (without knots) to build a Tyrolean Alps-style depot in 1916 where passengers changed trains at Willits. A Pullman car began operating between Fort Bragg and San Francisco in May, 1921; and this steam passenger train continued operating in addition to the Skunk railbus schedule until November, 1929.

In 1916 a  logging branch line was built northward along the Pacific coast from Fort Bragg to the Ten Mile River and up the middle fork of the river to Camp 6. A  branch extended up the north fork of the Ten Mile River to Clark Fork Landing. Trains brought logs from the Ten Mile River to the Fort Bragg sawmill until the rails were replaced by a road for logging trucks in 1949. Much of the former railroad grade between Fort Bragg and the Ten Mile River is presently used as a MacKerricher State Park coastal trail; and an unused trestle is visible from California State Route 1 on the beach at the mouth of Pudding Creek. The original rail line to Glen Blair operated as a branch line from Glen Blair Junction at the west portal of tunnel #1 until dismantled in 1942.

On December 19, 1947, the railroad name was shortened to the California Western Railroad. In 1952, the railroad retired all of its steam locomotives in favor for diesel power. On September 26, 1964 westbound railcar M-80, carrying 32 members of San Mateo Masonic Lodge No. 226 on a sightseeing excursion, ran past its scheduled meeting place to collide head-on with eastbound railcar M-100, carrying 41 members of the Aircraft Pilot's Club of Oakland. The incident sent nine of the westbound occupants to the local hospital with serious injuries. Union Lumber and its California Western Railroad came under the ownership of the various lumber producers, including Boise Cascade (1969), and later Georgia-Pacific Corporation (G-P). A January 1970, derailment on the horseshoe curves destroyed diesel locomotives 51, 52 and 54. The engineer and fireman were able to jump clear when the air brakes failed on a downgrade train. G-P initially leased the CWR's operations to Kyle Railways, but in June 1987 the CWR was sold to the Kyle Railways subsidiary Mendocino Coast Railway. Mendocino Coast Railway continued to operate the CWR under the California Western name.  No longer able to make a profit when the G-P mill began to reduce operations and finally closed altogether, Kyle Railways opted to sell the financially starved CWR. On December 17, 2003 the California Western Railroad was rescued when it was bought by the Sierra Railroad. The Skunk Train is owned and operated by Mendocino Railway, a subsidiary of the Sierra Railroad.

Route

Freight traffic
The railroad owned 199 freight cars in 1912, including 156 flatcars for logs and lumber, six tank cars for locomotive fuel oil, three boxcars, a stock car, and some ballast cars. California Western leased steel freight cars from other railroads when these wooden cars became unsuitable for interchange service. Most of the old wooden cars were scrapped when the Ten Mile River branch was dismantled in 1949, but a few remained in use for maintenance of way service and to move lumber around the Fort Bragg sawmill yard.

In the late 1980s, the railroad's freight redwood lumber traffic rapidly declined. Georgia-Pacific gradually shifted lumber shipments to more flexible highway trucks until the Northwestern Pacific Railroad [North Coast Railroad Authority] was embargoed and shut-down from Willits to the California Northern Railroad and Union Pacific mainline connection near the SF Bay Area. By 1996, before the NWP embargo, CWR lumber shipments were less than 500 cars per year and passenger service became the line's main source of revenue. All freight service was discontinued in 2001, and the Federal Railroad Administration's emergency order effectively cut the CWR off from the national rail network.

Skunk Train

Gas-powered, self-propelled, passenger railcars were added in 1925; and, after Pullman service was discontinued, CWR steam passenger trains ran only when the motorcars were out of service for maintenance. The passenger coaches were scrapped in 1949. The motorcars were nicknamed "Skunks" because people said, "You can smell 'em before you can see 'em." In 1965 the line reintroduced summer steam passenger service between Fort Bragg and Willits with "Super Skunk" Baldwin-built steam locomotive No.45 pulling four former Erie Lackawanna Railway  Stillwell coaches built in 1926. That train was discontinued in 2001, then revived in September 2006. No.45 continues to power excursion trains from Fort Bragg, California as far as Northspur, California, the CWR's midpoint, on selected weekends summer to early autumn.

Without the considerable revenue lumber and general merchandise freight once contributed to the bottom line, maintaining the railway through such rugged terrain is a major undertaking, both logistically and financially, and service is not always available for the full trip from Fort Bragg to Willits, California. However, shorter trips to intermediate points usually run year-round.

Tunnel No. 1 closures 
Without sufficient cash reserves to finance the excavation the railroad announced a fundraising campaign on June 7, selling lifetime passes and seeking private donations to meet a goal set at $300,000, the estimated cost to remove the blockage and repair the tunnel walls. The announcement explicitly stated that if some manner of external funding was not secured it would have no option but to cease operations permanently. On June 19, Save the Redwoods League announced an offer to pay the amount required to meet the fundraising goal in exchange for a conservation easement along the track's  right-of-way. The acceptance of the offer allowed the railroad to resume full service in August 2013.

Tunnel No. 1 was once again closed in 2016 after sustaining damage from the 2015–16 El Nino, but the railway was left in a better position, having equipment at the Willits depot to allow the running of half-routes to the Northspur Junction and back (which was not the case during the 2013 crisis); trains from Fort Bragg are limited to running only  to the Glen Blair Junction (one hour round trip) before returning to the depot, officially called the "Pudding Creek Express."

No announcements regarding the status of Tunnel No. 1 have been made since 2015, though the railroad is fully committed to its reopening. Both tunnel collapses were related to the hillside, which has a history of instability dating back to its construction in 1893.

Railbike tours began in 2018 as a response to the tunnel closures, with multiple other tourist lines around the country introducing their own railbike experiences after the California Western's railbikes proved very popular.

The railroad applied for a United States Department of Transportation BUILD grant in 2018 to fund tunnel repairs and replace over 30,000 ties made of chromated copper arsenate installed by Kyle Railways; this grant was denied in February 2019, but the request was reportedly in the top-third of those sent, and the Department of Transportation encouraged the railroad to re-apply. The railroad also planned to address deferred maintenance issues, and upgrade its tracks for commuter and freight service in anticipation of the reopening of the Northwestern Pacific to Willits and the potential extension of Sonoma–Marin Area Rail Transit (SMART) to Willits. Had the grant been approved, reconstruction of Tunnel #1 would have begun in 2019 and be complete by 2021, while tie replacement would have lasted until 2024.

The railroad plans to reopen the tunnel by the end of 2022.

Expansion plans
In 2019, the railroad purchased  of the former Fort Bragg Georgia-Pacific mill for redevelopment and extending service to a new terminal. In 2021, they acquired an additional  site from Georgia-Pacific.

Steam locomotives

Diesel locomotives

In popular culture 
Pop Singer Michelle Lambert performed weekly shows on the Skunk Train during her teenage years.

The railroad has also been featured in several movies, including The Signal Tower (1924), Racing with the Moon (1984), and The Majestic (2001). The M-300 railcar also appears in the 2019 video game Transport Fever 2, the 2016 video game Transport Fever, and the 2014 video game Train Fever, as the first multiple unit that can be built, even carrying the railroad's familiar skunk mascot.

See also

List of heritage railroads in the United States

References

Notes

Bibliography 
 CWR & Union Lumber corporate records and ULCo/CWR history book manuscript being prepared by K.V. Bunker, 2006.

External links

Skunk Train Home Page
California Scenic Line, ca. 1900 online photo collection, The Bancroft Library
1965 documentary on the return of steam to the route.
Skunk Train Photos photo gallery from 2012
Skunk Line Stations mile-by-mile guide

Heritage railroads in California
Logging railroads in the United States
Transportation in Mendocino County, California
Defunct California railroads
Tourist attractions in Mendocino County, California